This is a list of wars and rebellions involving the United States of America. Currently, there are 105 wars on this list, 4 of which are ongoing.

18th-century wars

19th-century wars

20th-century wars

21st-century wars

See also
 List of armed conflicts involving the United States
 Military history
 Timeline of United States military operations
 United States involvement in regime change
 List of ongoing armed conflicts

Notes

References

External links
 Heidelberg Institute for International Conflict Research (HIIK)
 Conflict Barometer – Describes recent trends in conflict development, escalations, and settlements
 A Continent Divided: The U.S.-Mexico War, Center for Greater Southwestern Studies, the University of Texas at Arlington
 Timeline of wars involving the United States, Histropedia
 U.S. Periods of War and Dates of Recent Conflicts, Congressional Research Service

 
United States
Wars
Wars